The 1978–79 season was the 33rd season in FK Partizan's existence. This article shows player statistics and matches that the club played during the 1978–79 season.

Players

Squad information

Friendlies

Competitions

Yugoslav First League

Yugoslav Cup

European Cup

First round

See also
 List of FK Partizan seasons

References

External links
 Official website
 Partizanopedia 1978-79  (in Serbian)

FK Partizan seasons
Partizan